Edraw Max is a 2D business technical diagramming software which helps create flowcharts, organizational charts, mind map,  network diagrams, floor plans, workflow diagrams, business charts, and engineering diagrams. The current version, Edraw Max 11.5.0 was released in November 2021 for Microsoft Windows, macOS, and Linux. Edraw Max is a Visio-like diagramming tool.

Main features 
Edraw Max can be used to create diagrams or charts with its built-in editable symbols and templates for a range of categories.

The current version, Edraw Max, is available in two editions: Free Viewer Version and  Professional Editable Version. The latter has additional templates and examples for creating diagrams.

Compatibility

Windows 

 2000/2003/2008/Vista/7/8/10
 32 bit/64 bit
 XP Edraw Max Version 8.4

Mac 

 Mac OS X 10.10 and later

Linux 

 Linux OS X Debian, Ubuntu, Fedora, CentOS, OpenSUSE, Mint, Knoppix, RedHat, Gentoo and more.

Minimum system requirements 

 1GB of RAM
 1G processor
 800 MB of hard disk space
 1024 * 768 monitor resolution

File format
Edraw Max saves content in an XML file format. The .eddx suffix is the default file format. The .edxz suffix is a compressed XML file format used for sharing.

Versions 
Below is a list of updates from Edraw Max 1.0 to the present.

See also 

 List of concept- and mind-mapping software

References

External links 
 

Diagramming software
Technical communication tools
Windows graphics-related software
UML tools